Anaïs Ségalas, born Anne Caroline Menard (24 September 1811, Paris – 31 August 1893, Paris) was a French playwright, poet and novelist. She was a member of Société La Voix des Femmes in Paris in 1848 and of other Parisian feminist organizations.

Life 
Anne Caroline Menard was born on 24 September 1811 in the former 6th arrondissement of Paris. She was the only daughter of Charles Menard and Anne Bonne Portier, a Creole from Santo Domingo. Her father, Charles Menard, was a vegetarian, activist of the animal cause, misanthrope. When he died, Menard was 11 years old.

Menard got acquainted with the neighbor Jean Victor Ségalas, a lawyer at the Royal Court and they got married on 17 January 1827. She took the name Anaïs Ségalas and made her husband promise never to oppose her passion for writing. Ségalas’ first poems were published in 1827. In 1829, La Psyché published her first essays, and in 1831 eight poems Les Algériennes appeared in La Gazette littéraire. In mid-1830, Ségalas collaborated with a Christian newspaper Le Journal des Femmes.

On 15 December 1838, Ségalas gave birth to her daughter Bertile Claire Gabrielle whom she dedicated the volume Enfantines published in 1844. In 1847, Ségalas published a collection of moralizing and didactic poems of various kinds of states of woman La Femme. The next year, in 1848, she became a member of Société La Voix des Femmes in Paris and of other Parisian feminist organizations.

In the 1840s, Ségalas started to write theater plays. In 1847, her first play La Loge de l'Opéra, a drama in 3 acts, was performed at the Odeon theater. In the following years her plays Le Trembleur, Les Deux Amoureux de la grand’mère and Les Absents ont raison were staged in Paris theaters.

In 1861, she published a collection of poetry, Idéal et Réalités.

Aged 81, Ségalas wrote her last comedy in 1 act Deux passions which had a world success.  

Anaïs Ségalas died on 31 August 1893 in Paris. In 1917, the French Academy created the Anaïs Ségalas Prize for Literature and Philosophy, intended to reward the work of talented women. The last prize was awarded in 1989.

Works 

 Les Algériennes, poésies, 1831
 Les Oiseaux de passage, poésies, 1837 
 Enfantines, poésies à ma fille, 1844 
 Poésies, 1844 
 La Femme, poésies, 1847
 Contes du nouveau Palais de Cristal, 1855
 Nos bons Parisiens, poésies, 1864 
 La Semaine de la marquise, 1865 
 Les Mystères de la maison, 1865
 La Dette du cœur, poésies, 1869
 La Vie de feu, 1875
 Les Mariages dangereux, 1878
 Les Rieurs de Paris, 1880
 Les Romans du wagon. Le Duel des femmes. Le Bois de la Soufrière. Un roman de famille. Le Figurant, 1884
 Le Livre des vacances. L'Oncle d'Amérique et le neveu de France. Zozo, Polyte et Marmichet. Une rencontre sur la neige, 1885
 Récits des Antilles. Le Bois de la Soufrière, 1885
 Les Deux Fils, 1886
 Poésies pour tous, 1886
 Le Compagnon invisible, 1888

Theater plays 

 La Loge de l’Opér, 1847
 Le Trembleur, 1849
 Les Deux Amoureux de la grand’mère, 1850
 Les Absents ont raison, 1852
 Les Inconvénients de la sympathie, 1854
 Deux passions, 1893

References

Bibliography 

 Albistur, Maïté and Daniel Armogathe. History of French feminism from the Middle Ages to the present day. 2 flights, Paris: Des Femmes, 1977.
 Beaunier, André. Faces of women. 5th ed. Paris: Plon-Nourrit, 1913.
 Cooper, Barbara T. "Race, Gender, and Colonialism in Anaïs Ségalas’s Stories from the West Indies: Le Bois de la  Soufrière." In "Engendering Race: Romantic-Era Women and French Colonial Memory," edited by Adrianna M. Paliyenko, special issue, L'Esprit Créateur 47, no. 4 (Winter 2007): 118–29.
 Czyba, Luce, “Anaïs Ségalas (1814-1893)". In Women poets of the nineteenth century: An anthology,  edited by Christine Planté.185-92. 2nd ed. Lyon: University Press of Lyon, 2010.
 Delaville, Camille Chartier. My contemporaries. 1st ser. Paris: P. Sévin, 1887.
 Desplantes, François, and Paul Pouthier. Women of letters in France 1890. Geneva: Slatkine Reprints, 1970.
 Jacob, Paul. “Mrs. Ségalas". In Biography of Women Authors, edited by Alfred de Montferrand, 37–47. Paris: Armand-Aubrée, 1836.
 Moulin, Jeanine. “Female poetry from the 12th to the 19th century". Paris: Seghers, 1966.
 Dried, Alphonse. The French muses: Anthology of women poets from the eighteenth to the twentieth, 2 vols. Paris: Louis Michaud, 1908–1909.
 Sullerot, Evelyne. History of the women's press in France from its origins to 1848 . Paris: Armand Colin, 1966.

1811 births
1893 deaths
19th-century French women writers
19th-century French poets
French feminists